Mohammed Kasseb Al-Raqad is a Jordanian physician, a Brigadier general in the Jordanian Royal medical services and a consultant in the field of clinical genetics.

Qualifications
 M.B.B.S. Degree in medicine and surgery 9 June 1991: University of Jordan, School of Medicine, Amman-Jordan
Doctoral degree in Clinical Genetics 11/2/2011. Newcastle upon Tyne University/UK.
 MSc in Medical Genetics 3 December 2004 from University of Glasgow /UK. 
 Jordanian Board of Paediatrics September 1997, issued by The Jordanian Medical Council.
 Permanent License to practice pediatrics Medicine, Jordan 1997.
 Permanent License to practice Medicine, Jordan 1992.

Positions & social activities
 Consultant of clinical genetics at Queen Rania Al-Abdullah Children Hospital/ King Hussein Medical Centre, Royal Medical Services, Amman-Jordan.    
 Head of clinical genetic unit at Queen Rania Al-Abdullah Children Hospital/ King Hussein Medical Centre.
 Part-time lecturer at faculty of Medicine in Jordan University of Science & Technology since 2011.
 Field Hospital Pediatrician in Ramallah/ Palestine; May- June 2002.
 Director of the Field Jordanian Hospital in Gaza/Palestine; April- July 2013.
 Member of Jordanian Medical Association.
 Member of Jordanian Pediatric Association.

Awards
 Military Order of Merit; honoured by King Abdullah II, a reward for his contribution in scientific research on June 10, 2015.
 NATO Medal for service with NATO operations in relation to Kosovo during period of May 10, 1999-Feb 12, 2000 as a field hospital Pediatrician.

References

External links
 Al-Raqad Publications, Google scholar.

Academic staff of Jordan University of Science and Technology
Living people
Jordanian military personnel
1967 births
Jordanian pediatricians